The 1936 Pacific Tigers football team represented the College of the Pacific—now known as the University of the Pacific—in Stockton, California as a member of the Far Western Conference (FWC) during the 1936 college football season. Led by fourth-year head coach Amos Alonzo Stagg, Pacific compiled an overall record of 5–4–1 with a mark of 4–0 in conference play, winning the FWC title. The team outscored its opponents 107 to 63 for the season. The Tigers played home games at Baxter Stadium in Stockton.

Schedule

Notes

References

Pacific
Pacific Tigers football seasons
Northern California Athletic Conference football champion seasons
Pacific Tigers football